The Korea Cup was an international football tournament held annually in South Korea from 1971 to 1999.

History 
The Korea Cup was created with the name President's Cup Football Tournament (simply known as Park's Cup) by the Korea Football Association in 1971, and was contested between South Korea national team and Asian teams to develop them. It changed its name to President Park's Cup Football Tournament in 1976, and invited not only Asian teams, but also teams of other continents since that year. It once again changed its name to President's Cup International Football Tournament in 1979,and the latest Korea Cup appeared in 1995.

Summary

Statistics

Titles by team

Titles by nation

All-time table

Awards

Most Valuable Player

Top goalscorer

See also
 South Korea national football team
 South Korea national football B team
 Korea Football Association
 Peace Cup

References

External links
 President's Cup (South Korea) at RSSSF

 
Defunct football competitions in South Korea
International association football competitions hosted by South Korea
International men's association football invitational tournaments